Sri Dharmasthala Manjunatheshwara College of Dental Sciences is a dental school in Karnataka, India. It is located in Dharwad and was founded in 1986. It is located at Sattur, Dharwad on National Highway 4.

Sri Dharmasthala Manjunatheswara College of Dental Sciences offers undergraduate and postgraduate programs.

The college initially started at the campus of S.D.M College of Engineering and Technology and later shifted to its own campus at Sattur in 1990's. It is the examination centre for FRCS in India.

External Internet sites 
SDM College of Dental Sciences Home page 

Dental colleges in Karnataka
1986 establishments in Karnataka
Universities and colleges in Hubli-Dharwad
Educational institutions established in 1986